The Ireland Fed Cup team represents Ireland in Fed Cup tennis competition and are governed by Tennis Ireland.  They currently compete in the Europe/Africa Zone of Group III.

History
Ireland competed in its first Fed Cup in 1964.  Their best result was reaching the round of 16 in 1972.

Current team
Amy Bowtell
Julie Byrne
Jenny Claffey
Lauren Deegan
Rachael Dillon
Sinéad Lohan
Lynsey McCullough

See also
 Fed Cup
 Ireland Davis Cup team
 Sport in Ireland

External links

Billie Jean King Cup teams
Fed Cup
Fed Cup